The Northern Mariana Islands national badminton team represents Northern Mariana Islands, an unincorporated territory and commonwealth of the United States, in international badminton team competitions. The Northern Mariana Islands national team is controlled by the Northern Marianas Badminton Association in Saipan.

The Northern Mariana Islands have only competed in one major team tournament. The mixed team competed in the 2022 Pacific Mini Games after qualifying as host nation. The team finished in fourth place after only scoring 2 points in the overall group tie.

Participation in Pacific Mini Games
Mixed team

Participation in Oceania Badminton Championships

Mixed team

Current squad 
The following players were selected to represent the Northern Mariana Islands at the 2022 Pacific Mini Games.

Male players
Jordan Pangilinan
Andreau Galvez
Nathan Guerrero
Daniel Macario
Ezekiel Macario
Leonard Manuel

Female players
Windy Fernandez
Janelle Pangilinan
Jenine Savellano
Jeanelyn Cardinio
Michaella Serrano
Mikamaika Serrano

References

https://northernmarianas2022.com/badminton/

National badminton teams
National sports teams of the Northern Mariana Islands